Kelvin Creswell Rivers (born March 1, 1987) is an American professional basketball player for BC Samara of the VTB United League.

High school career
Rivers attended high school at Oak Hill Academy, in Mouth of Wilson, Virginia, where he played high school basketball. While there, he helped his team capture two USA Today national high school basketball championships. In those two years, his team's record was a combined 72–2. He holds Oak Hill's record for the most three-point field goals made in a game, with 15.

College career
Rivers played college basketball at Clemson University, with the Clemson Tigers, seeing action in 102 games, while starting 55 of those games. Rivers averaged 14.2 points, and grabbed 6 rebounds a game, in his four years at Clemson.

Professional career
After failing to be drafted in the 2009 NBA draft, Rivers signed with AB Latina of the Italian LegaDue Basket, the Italian second-tier league, in August 2009. In 10 games with Latina, he averaged 24.5 points and 5.7 rebounds per game, and in December 2009, he signed with Benetton Treviso of the Italian top-tier league, the LBA, for the remainder of the season.

On June 30, 2010, he signed a contract with Chorale Roanne of the French LNB Pro A for the 2010–11 season. In January 2011, he returned to Italy and signed with Virtus Bologna, for the rest of the season.

On July 29, 2011, he signed a one-year deal with Lokomotiv Kuban of Russia. On May 30, 2012, he signed a two-year deal with another Russian team, Khimki Moscow Region. In July 2013, he parted ways with Khimki. 

In November 2013, he was acquired by the Reno Bighorns of the NBA D-League. In 47 games played in the D-league, he averaged 15.8 points and 4 rebounds per game, during the 2013–14 season.

On August 7, 2014, he signed a one-year deal with the Spanish club Real Madrid. In the 2014–15 season, Real Madrid continued its successes in the EuroLeague from the previous seasons, advancing to the EuroLeague Final Four for the third straight time. In the semifinal game against Fenerbahçe Ülker, Rivers helped his team to secure its third straight EuroLeague Finals appearance, by scoring 17 points, on 5 of 6 shooting from the three-point line, in a 96–87 win. Real Madrid eventually won the EuroLeague championship, after defeating Olympiacos in the EuroLeague Final, by a score of 78–59. Over the season, Rivers averaged 5.3 points, 2.3 rebounds, and 1.1 assists per game, to help his team win its ninth EuroLeague title overall, and its first in 20 years. Real Madrid eventually finished the season by also winning the Spanish League championship, after a 3–0 series sweep in the Spanish League Finals series against Barcelona. With the Spanish League title, they won the triple crown.

On September 8, 2015, Rivers signed a one-year contract with the German club Bayern Munich. On December 22, 2015, he left Bayern, and returned to his former club, Real Madrid, for the rest of the season.

On July 24, 2016, Rivers signed a 1+1 deal with the Greek club Panathinaikos.

On December 7, 2018, Rivers signed a deal with the Italian club Pallacanestro Reggiana. He parted ways with Reggiana in February 2019.

On February 11, 2019, Rivers signed for Serbian club Crvena zvezda for the rest of the 2018–19 season. On August 20, 2019, Rivers signed a one-year deal with Spanish club Coosur Real Betis.

On November 22, 2019, Rivers signed with Lithuanian club  Žalgiris Kaunas for the remainder of the 2019–2020 season.

On July 6, 2020, Rivers signed with BC Zenit Saint Petersburg for the 2020–2021 season. On July 9, 2021, Rivers officially parted ways with the Russian club. On December 10, he returned to Bayern Munich. Rivers parted ways with the team on January 25, 2022.

On February 22, 2022, Rivers signed with Hapoel Jerusalem B.C. in Israel.

On August 3, 2022, he has signed with BC Samara of the VTB United League.

Career statistics

EuroLeague

|-
| style="text-align:left;"| 2012–13
| style="text-align:left;"| Khimki
| 24 || 17 || 26.3 || .445 || .364 || .533 || 2.7 || 1.5 || .8 || .1 || 9.6 || 7.5
|-
| style="text-align:left;background:#AFE6BA;"| 2014–15†
| style="text-align:left;" | Real Madrid
| 30 || 16 || 17.0 || .432 || .411 || 1.000 || 2.3 || 1.1 || .6 || .0 || 5.3 || 5.1
|-
| style="text-align:left;"| 2015–16
| style="text-align:left;"| Bayern
| 10 || 2 || 23.5 || .457 || .431 || .667 || 2.3 || 1.3 || .5 || .1 || 10.8 || 8.0
|-
| style="text-align:left;"| 2015–16
| style="text-align:left;"| Real Madrid
| 17 || 4 || 17.5 || .609 || .315 || .778 || 1.5 || .8 || .8 || .1 || 6.7 || 5.7
|-
| style="text-align:left;"| 2016–17
| style="text-align:left;" rowspan=2| Panathinaikos
| 33 || 5 || 27.4 || .488 || .420 || .780 || 2.5 || .8 || .8 || .1 || 11.2 || 7.7
|-
| style="text-align:left;"| 2017–18
| 31 || 4 || 23.2 || .500 || .358 || .656 || 2.7 || .8 || 1.1 || .1 || 8.5 || 6.5
|- class="sortbottom"
| style="text-align:left;"| Career
| style="text-align:left;"|
| 145 || 48 || 22.4 || .503 || .386 || .701 || 2.4 || 1.2 || .8 || .1 || 8.7 || 6.9

Domestic leagues

Personal life
Rivers is the nephew of former NBA player Byron Dinkins. Rivers is married, and has 2 children, Maiyah and Micah.

References

External links
 Liga ACB profile 
 draftexpress.com profile
 eurobasket.com profile
 EuroLeague profile
 FIBA profile
 LNB Pro A profile

1987 births
Living people
ABA League players
American expatriate basketball people in France
American expatriate basketball people in Germany
American expatriate basketball people in Greece
American expatriate basketball people in Italy
American expatriate basketball people in Lithuania
American expatriate basketball people in Russia
American expatriate basketball people in Serbia
American expatriate basketball people in Spain
American men's basketball players
Basketball League of Serbia players
Basketball players from Charlotte, North Carolina
Bissau-Guinean men's basketball players
BC Khimki players
BC Žalgiris players
BC Zenit Saint Petersburg players
Chorale Roanne Basket players
Clemson Tigers men's basketball players
FC Bayern Munich basketball players
Hapoel Jerusalem B.C. players
KK Crvena zvezda players
Liga ACB players
Oak Hill Academy (Mouth of Wilson, Virginia) alumni
Pallacanestro Treviso players
Panathinaikos B.C. players
PBC Lokomotiv-Kuban players
Real Betis Baloncesto players
Real Madrid Baloncesto players
Reno Bighorns players
Shooting guards
Small forwards
Virtus Bologna players